Felix Harrison Knight (December 10, 1876 – October 13, 1952) was an American labor union leader.

Born in Montgomery County, Missouri, Knight worked for the St. Louis Street Railway, and joined the Amalgamated Association of Street, Electric Railway and Motor Coach Employees.  He later moved to work on the Chicago, Burlington and Quincy Railroad, and in 1902 he joined the Brotherhood of Railway Carmen.

Knight quickly came to prominence in the Carmen's union; in the same year he joined, he was elected as financial secretary and chair and chair of his local board; and in 1903, as a delegate to the St. Louis Central Trades and Labor Union.  In 1913, he was appointed as assistant general president of the carmen.  From 1918 to 1920, he additionally served on the National Railroad Adjustment Board, and he was appointed again in 1934.

In 1935, Knight became president of the Carmen.  He was also elected to the executive of the American Federation of Labor's (AFL) Railway Employes' Department, and in 1936, as a vice-president of the AFL.  In that role, he worked on disputes with the Congress of Industrial Organizations, and in 1939, he was the AFL delegate to the British Trades Union Congress.

In 1946, Knight was appointed to an AFL committee investigating the labor movement in Argentina.  He retired from his union posts in 1947, and died five years later.

References

1876 births
1952 deaths
American trade union leaders
People from Montgomery County, Missouri
Trade unionists from Missouri